China competed in the 2003 Asian Winter Games which were held in Aomori Prefecture, Japan from February 1, 2003 to February 8, 2003.

See also
 China at the Asian Games
 China at the Olympics
 Sports in China

Asian Games
China at the Asian Winter Games
Nations at the 2003 Asian Winter Games